Pamulinawen is a popular old Ilocano folk song possibly from the pre-Spanish era. It is about a girl with a hardened heart. who does not need  her lover's pleading. It is about courtship and love.

In popular culture

The folk song was featured in Ryan Cayabyab's 15 track album titled Bahaghari, sung by Miss Lea Salonga.

It has been performed and interpreted by different brass bands, orchestras and choral groups in the Philippines. The song was also performed as a traditional folk dance in festivals.

References

Philippine folk songs